The Church of Christ the Worker and Our Lady of Lourdes, also known simply as Iglesia de Estación Atlántida, is a Roman Catholic parish church and a World Heritage Site in Estación Atlántida, Uruguay.

Description 
The temple is dedicated to Christ the Worker and Our Lady of Lourdes. It constitutes a renowned architectural landmark, it was designed in 1958 by the engineer Eladio Dieste. It is architecturally striking, described as "a simple rectangle, with side walls rising up in undulating curves to the maximum amplitude of their arcs" these walls supporting a similarly undulating roof, composed of a sequence of reinforced brick Gaussian vaults developed by Eladio Dieste.

The cylindrical bell-tower, built in openwork exposed brick masonry, rises from the ground to the right of the main church facade, while the underground baptistery is located on the left side of the parvis, accessible from a triangular prismatic entrance and illuminated via a central oculus. 

The Church provides an eminent example of the remarkable formal and spatial achievements of modern architecture in Latin America during the second part of the 20th century, embodying the search for social equality with a spare use of resources, meeting structural imperatives to great aesthetic effect.

The material is a very simple brickwork, which conforms a novel utilization of exposed bricks in a reinforced ceramics structure.

In 2021 the Church was proclaimed as a UNESCO World Heritage Site under the name "The work of engineer Eladio Dieste: Church of Atlántida".

References

External links
 Pictures of "Cristo Obrero"

Roman Catholic churches completed in 1960

Roman Catholic church buildings in Canelones Department
Modernist architecture in Uruguay
Eladio Dieste buildings
20th-century Roman Catholic church buildings in Uruguay